Polina Petrovna Gorshkova (born 22 July 1989) is a Russian handballer for CSKA Moscow and the Russian national team.

Achievements 
 Russian Super League
Gold: 2008
Silver: 2007, 2014, 2015, 2017, 2018, 2019
Bronze: 2009, 2011, 2012, 2016
 Russian Cup
Gold: 2006
Silver: 2007, 2009, 2015, 2019
Bronze: 2010, 2012, 2013, 2014

References

1989 births
Living people
Sportspeople from Tolyatti
Russian female handball players
Handball players at the 2020 Summer Olympics
Olympic silver medalists for the Russian Olympic Committee athletes
Olympic medalists in handball
Medalists at the 2020 Summer Olympics
Universiade gold medalists for Russia
Universiade medalists in handball
Medalists at the 2015 Summer Universiade